The Collected Short Stories of Roald Dahl is a 1991 short story collection for adults by Roald Dahl. The collection containing tales of macabre malevolence comprises many of Dahl's stories seen in the television series Tales of the Unexpected and previously collected in Someone Like You (1953), Kiss, Kiss (1960), Twenty-Nine Kisses from Roald Dahl (1969), Switch Bitch (1974), and Ah, Sweet Mystery of Life: The Country Stories of Roald Dahl (1989).

See also
 Tales of the Unexpected

References

1991 short story collections
Short story collections by Roald Dahl
Michael Joseph books